Crithe algoensis is a species of very small sea snail, a marine gastropod mollusk or micromollusk in the family Cystiscidae.

Distribution
This marine species occurs in Algoa Bay

References

 Smith, E.A. (1901) On South African marine shells, with descriptions of new species. Journal of Conchology, 10, 104–116, 1 pl.
 Lussi M. & Smith G. (1998) Family Cystiscidae Stimpson, 1865. Revision of the family Cystiscidae in South Africa with the introduction of three genera and the description of eight new species. Malacologia Mostra Mondiale 27: 3–23

Cystiscidae
Gastropods described in 1901
Algoensis